Martin Rinkart, or Rinckart (23 April 1586, Eilenburg – 8 December 1649) was a German Lutheran clergyman and hymnist. He is best known for the text to "Nun danket alle Gott" ("Now thank we all our God") which was written c. 1636. It was set to music by Johann Crüger about 1647, and translated into English in the 19th century by Catherine Winkworth.

Rinkart was a deacon at Eisleben and archdeacon at Eilenburg, where he was born and also died. He served there during the Thirty Years' War and a severe plague in 1637.

Hymns
 Nun danket alle Gott  (Now thank we all our God)

External links
 Martin Rinkart hymnary.org
 Martin Rinckart (Hymn-Writer) Bach Cantatas Website
 
 

1586 births
1649 deaths
Renaissance composers
People from Eilenburg
German Lutherans
German Lutheran hymnwriters
German male composers
17th-century German composers
17th-century German people
17th-century hymnwriters
17th-century German musicians
17th-century male musicians